AZM Rezwanul Haque Bangladesh Nationalist Party politician. He was elected a member of parliament from Dinajpur-5 in February 1996.

Career 
Haque joined the BNP in 1995. He was elected to parliament from Dinajpur-5 as a Bangladesh Nationalist Party candidate in 15 February 1996 Bangladeshi general election. He was defeated from Dinajpur-5 constituency on 1991, 12 June 1996, 2001, 2008 and 2018 on the nomination of Bangladesh Nationalist Party. He is the convener of Dinajpur district BNP.

References 

Living people
Year of birth missing (living people)
Bangladesh Nationalist Party politicians
6th Jatiya Sangsad members
People from Parbatipur Upazila
20th-century Bengalis
21st-century Bengalis